Eugene A. "Gene" Conti, Jr. (born December 23, 1946) is an American government official. He served as Secretary of the Maryland Department of Labor, Licensing and Regulation from 1995 through 1998, when he became Assistant Secretary for Transportation Policy at the United States Department of Transportation.

In 2009, then-Governor-elect Beverly Perdue named Conti as the new Secretary of the North Carolina Department of Transportation, where he served until January, 2013, and was succeeded in that post by Tony Tata. He had served as deputy secretary for that department from 2001 through 2003.

References

News & Observer profile page
U.S. Senate Confirms Eugene A. Conti, Jr. as Assistant Secretary for Transportation Policy
Maryland biography

Living people
1946 births
State cabinet secretaries of North Carolina
State cabinet secretaries of Maryland
United States Department of Transportation officials